Qazi Syed Mohammad Rafi (died age 23, March 1803 CE) was an Islamic religious fundamentalist from Mewat (Haryana) in the British Raj. He was an influential personality in areas near Mewat and authored many books on religious issues.

Biography
Mohammad Rafi was a scholar from the Mewat region who lived during the 17th and 18th centuries CE. He was a Muslim fundamentalist faqih who learned Sharia law like his father, Qazi Syed Mohammad Zaman. Being qadi of the city, he was responsible for its administrative and managerial affairs.

Rafi belonged to the Sayyid. He married Fazal Nisan; they had two sons, Qazi Syed Mohammad Ashraf and Syed Mohammad Shamsuddin, and one daughter, Bibi Khan Daulat. Due to his knowledge of Islam, Rafi's son Shamsuddin was employed in the army at Nagpur. Rafi's brother-in-laws were both killed in combat - Raham Ali at Pargana Hansi and Mohammad Murad at Rewari, during a war with Jauhira Singh and Zaufa Singh. Rafi's great-grandchildren are remembered as accomplished Urdu and Persian scholars. They founded Jhajjar Bagh at Hansapuri (now Mominpura) in Nagpur and built a home there called Aina-e Mahal.

See also 
Qazi Syed Rafi Mohammad
Qazi Syed Inayatullah
Qazi Syed Hayatullah
Hakim Syed Karam Husain
Syed Ziaur Rahman

References 

People from Jhajjar
1803 deaths
People from Ferozepur Jhirka
People from Mewat
People from Rewari
Indian Sunni Muslim scholars of Islam
Hanafis
Gardēzī Sadaat
Year of birth unknown